Dawn of the Devi is the fifth studio album by American experimental rock band Sun City Girls, released in 1991 by Majora Records. It was remastered and reissued in 2019.

Critical reception
Trouser Press wrote: "There are pieces that stay on an even keel throughout — 'The Court Magicians of Agartha' puts an avant twist on kroncong (an Indonesian form of tango music) — but, for the most part, the album’s hazy insularity (perfectly captured in a sleeve photo that pictures the trio, back to its audience, lost in the throes of an improv high) doesn’t kowtow to stylistic neatniks." Paste wrote that the album "is evidence of three very close friends who have long since mastered the art of jamming on traditional rock tunes together and decided to use their mystical interpersonal connection to aim higher and deeper and weirder." The Spin Alternative Record Guide praised the "hyperkinetic sonic disruption."

Track listing

Personnel
Adapted from the Dawn of the Devi liner notes.

Sun City Girls
 Alan Bishop – bass guitar
 Richard Bishop – guitar
 Charles Gocher – drums, percussion

Production and additional personnel
 John Belluzzi – engineering (A1)
 Kevin Crosslin – engineering (B1)
 Marlene Healey – cover art
 Chuck Holder – editing
 Larry Nix – mastering
 David Oliphant – engineering (B2)
 Sun City Girls – mixing, engineering (A2, A3)

Release history

References 

1991 albums
Sun City Girls albums